Putli mandi, is a Filipino dessert steamed rice cake originating from the Tausug and Yakan people of Sulu. It is made from glutinous rice dough (though it can also be made with cassava) rolled into balls and filled with sweetened coconut strips (hinti). It traditionally uses pulut glutinous rice which gives it a natural deep purple color, but it is also commonly dyed in modern versions. It is sprinkled with fresh grated coconut before serving. The name comes from Tausug putli ("princess") and mandi ("bath"). 

Putlimandi is similar to pichi-pichi but differs in that pichi-pichi does not normally have fillings.

See also
Daral
 Pichi-pichi
 Cuchinta

References

Philippine desserts
Philippine rice dishes
Foods containing coconut
Rice cakes